The Watford Football Club Training Ground is the training ground and academy of the Premier League club Watford F.C. The centre is located on the University College London Union (UCLU) Shenley Sports grounds, in St Albans, Hertfordshire, situated between the Arsenal Training Centre and the de Havilland Aircraft Heritage Centre. The current Watford Training Ground was previously used by Arsenal F.C. until 1999 when they moved to their nearby own facilities.

With an approximate area of 83,000 m², the centre is home to 4 full-size natural grass training pitches, 1 full-size artificial turf training pitch, 2 seven-a-side natural grass football pitches as well as a service centre with gymnasium, press rooms and medical facilities.

References

Association football training grounds in England
Watford F.C.
Shenley